Port Saint Joe is the second studio album by American country music duo Brothers Osborne. It was released on April 20, 2018, through EMI Nashville. "Shoot Me Straight" is the album's lead single. The second single "I Don't Remember Me (Before You)" was released on October 8, 2018.

Commercial performance
The album debuted at No. 2 on Billboards Top Country Albums and No. 15 on the Billboard 200, selling 19,000 copies (22,000 album-equivalent units) in its first week. It has sold 90,600 copies in the United States as of October 2019.

Track listing

Personnel
Adapted from Port Saint Joe liner notes.

Brothers Osborne
 John Osborne – acoustic guitar, electric guitar, hand claps, mandolin, steel guitar, background vocals
 T. J. Osborne – lead vocals, acoustic guitar, hand claps

Additional musicians
 Adam Box – drums, hand claps
 Jason Graumlich – background vocals on "Slow Your Roll"
 Jay Joyce – background vocals, electric guitar, keyboards, percussion, programming, shaker, tambourine
 Lucie Silvas – background vocals on "A Couple Wrongs Makin' It Alright" and "A Little Bit Trouble"
 Pete Sternberg – bass guitar

Technical
 Jason Hall – recording, mixing
 Jay Joyce – production, mixing
 Andrew Mendelson – mastering

Charts

Weekly charts

Year-end charts

References

2018 albums
Albums produced by Jay Joyce
Brothers Osborne albums
EMI Records albums